, is a Japanese scholar born in 1936 in Tokyo, Japan.

Overviews 
He majored in Mathematical Engineering in 1958 from the University of Tokyo then graduated in 1963 from the Graduate School of the University of Tokyo.

His M. Eng. in  1960 was entitled Topological and Information-Theoretical Foundation of Diakoptics and Codiakoptics.
His Dr. Eng. in 1963 was entitled Diakoptics of Information Spaces.

Shun'ichi Amari received several awards and is a visiting professor of prestigious universities.

He is the author of more than 200 peer-reviewed articles

He is currently holding a position of the prestigious RIKEN lab and is vice-president of Brain Science Institute, director of Brain Style Information Systems Group  and team leader of Mathematical Neuroscience Laboratory.

He was a winner of the IEEE Emanuel R. Piore Award (1997)

Concepts developed
 Information Geometry

Key works
 A Geometrical Theory of Information (in Japanese), Kyoritsu, 1968
 Information Theory (in Japanese), Daiamondo-sha, 1971
 Mathematical Theory of Nerve Nets (in Japanese), Sangyotosho, 1978
 Methods of Information Geometry, in collaboration with Hiroshi Nagaoka, originally published  in Japanese in 1993 and published in English in 2000 with the American Mathematical Society (AMS).

Awards and honors
 Japan Academy Prize (1995)
 IEEE Emanuel R. Piore Award (1997)
 C&C Prize (2003)
 Person of Cultural Merit (2012)
 Order of Culture (2019)

References

External links
 Homepage at Riken lab
 Information Geometry and Its Applications presented during ETVC´08 - Paris in November 2008
 Unconventional Computation 2010 (UC10) at Toky, invited speaker
 ResearchMap profile

Japanese computer scientists
Japanese neuroscientists
Academic staff of the University of Tokyo
University of Tokyo alumni
People from Tokyo
Living people
1936 births
Riken personnel
Persons of Cultural Merit
Recipients of the Order of Culture